Isaac Elijah Messmore (August 21, 1821January 8, 1902) was a Canadian American lawyer, politician, and Union Army officer in the American Civil War.  He also held public office as a Wisconsin Circuit Court Judge and as a member of the Wisconsin State Assembly.

Biography
Born in Upper Canada, near Detroit, Isaac Messmore grew up in Michigan and later studied law as a young man, graduating from the Richmond Law School in Virginia; he went on to live in La Crosse, Wisconsin, where he practiced law in the 1850s.

In 1861, he served in the Wisconsin State Assembly as a Republican. Later in 1861, he was appointed a Wisconsin Circuit Court judge; however, his appointment to the bench was ruled to have been improperly authorized by the governor, and thus invalid.

Messmore next went on to serve in the 31st Wisconsin Volunteer Infantry Regiment during the American Civil War, attaining the rank of colonel.

After the end of the war, Messmore resettled in Washington, D.C., where he was very soon appointed assistant commissioner of the Internal Revenue Bureau. While in Washington, in 1867, he acquired the Meridian Hill estate, an older property which sat a short distance north of the White House; he then subdivided this tract of land, and its lots were sold to create a new neighborhood.

In the late 1860s, he next served on the Metropolitan Revenue Board of the City of New York, primarily fighting excise-tax fraud. Messmore subsequently moved to Grand Rapids, Michigan, where he purchased and became, in 1881, the editor and publisher of the newspaper The Democrat.

He relocated to California, in 1886, first to Orange County, and then to Los Angeles, where he formed a successful law partnership with fellow Wisconsin transplant Amasa Cobb.  He was also active in the California Democratic Party and was an unsuccessful candidate for the United States House of Representatives in California's 6th congressional district in 1894. Colonel Messmore was noted to have been a defender of the rights of the average citizen against the economic power of the railroads.

Family 
Isaac first married Editha McKenney in 1848; she died about 1860. He remarried, in about 1861, Margaret A. Jones ( Hull) of New York, who lived with him until his death. Children: a son, Charles and a daughter, Florence, as well as an adopted stepson, William Hull.

Isaac Messmore died in California in 1902, two days after the death of his wife, Margaret. Both died of pneumonia. Messmore died in Los Angeles, California on January 8, 1902.

Notes

External links

1821 births
1902 deaths
Politicians from Los Angeles
Politicians from Grand Rapids, Michigan
Politicians from La Crosse, Wisconsin
People of Wisconsin in the American Civil War
Wisconsin state court judges
Members of the Wisconsin State Assembly
California Democrats
Wisconsin Republicans
Editors of Michigan newspapers
University of Richmond School of Law alumni
19th-century American politicians
19th-century American judges